Kurt Johann Rapf (15 February 1922 – 9 March 2007) was an Austrian composer, conductor and organist.

Life 
Born in Vienna, Rapf studied conducting, organ, harpsichord, piano and musical composition at the University of Music and Performing Arts Vienna. After his studies he was engaged as assistant to Hans Knappertsbusch at the Zurich Opera House during the 1948/1949 season. From 1949 to 1953 he was professor at the University of Music and Performing Arts Vienna. From 1960 Rapf worked as a freelance conductor, organist, composer and piano accompanist. In 1968 he took over a class "Repertoire Studies" for singers and instrumentalists at the Music and Arts University of the City of Vienna.

Shortly after the end of the Second World War, Rapf founded the "Collegium Musicum Wien" which he directed until 1956. In 1986 he founded a chamber orchestra, the "Wiener Sinfonietta". As a conductor he made numerous tours abroad.

As a composer he created over 150 works, including an opera, two oratorios, four symphonies, numerous orchestral works, vocal, organ and chamber music. In 1981 he was the only European to receive the Outstanding Composition Award for the composition and premiere of his orchestral work "Poème symphonique" at the Yamaha Festival in Tokyo.

Rapf died in Vienna at the age of 85.

Awards and honours 
 1970 – Professorentitel
 1981 – Yamaha-Festival, Tokio: Outstanding Composition Award
 1982 – Austrian Decoration for Science and Art
 1988 – 
 1992 – 
 2002 – Decoration of Honour for Services to the Republic of Austria
 Honorary membership of the Austrian Composers' Association and other organizations

References

Further reading 
 Lukas Haselböck: Kurt Rapf. Lafite-Verlag, Wien 2002, .
 Karl Schütz: Zum Tod von Prof. Kurt Rapf. In Das Orgelforum. Issue 10 (July 2007). Verein Österreichisches Orgelforum, Vienna 2007, .

External links 
 
 Kurt Rapf. In mica.at (Biografie); retrieved 10 November 2010.
 

1922 births
2007 deaths
Musicians from Vienna
Austrian composers
20th-century classical composers
Classical organists
Academic staff of the University of Music and Performing Arts Vienna
Recipients of the Austrian Cross of Honour for Science and Art, 1st class